Three Cornered Moon is a 1933 American pre-Code comedy film directed by Elliott Nugent, written by Ray Harris and S.K. Lauren, and starring Claudette Colbert, Richard Arlen, Mary Boland, and Wallace Ford. Based on a 1933 play by Gertrude Tonkonogy Friedberg, the film reached No. 9 in the National Board of Review Awards top-10 films in 1933. Film critic Leonard Maltin identifies it as one of the "25 Vintage Movies You Really Shouldn't Miss".

Premise
Difficulties overtake a well-to-do family in New York when they lose all their money in the Great Crash of 1929.

Cast
Claudette Colbert as Elizabeth Rimplegar 
Richard Arlen as Dr. Alan Stevens 
Mary Boland as Nellie Rimpleger
Wallace Ford as Kenneth Rimpleger 
Lyda Roberti as Jenny 
Tom Brown as Eddie Rimplegar 
Joan Marsh as Kitty 
Hardie Albright as Ronald 
William Bakewell as Douglas Rimplegar 
Sam Hardy as Hawkins

References

External links
 
 
 
 Three Cornered Moon (available on DVD from Universal Vault Series)

1933 films
American black-and-white films
Paramount Pictures films
1933 comedy films
Films set in New York City
American films based on plays
Films directed by Elliott Nugent
American comedy films
Films produced by B. P. Schulberg
1930s American films